is a style of Okinawan karate and is one of the two oldest karate styles, alongside Shōrin-ryū. It was developed at the end of the 19th century by Higaonna Kanryō in Naha, Okinawa.

Etymology

Shōrei-ryū means "the style of inspiration" and certain martial arts scholars believe that the term Shōrei is derived from the Shoreiji Temple  located in either Fujian or Mount Jiulian of Longnan, Jiangxi.

Origin
Little is known about the origins of Shōrei-ryū, but it was influenced in its early development by Shuri-te. Kanryo Higashionna originally studied Shuri-te with Sokon Matsumura and learnt quanfa from Chinese Wai Xinxian (assistant of Xie Zhongxiang). Higaonna later traveled to China to perfect his skills, which he probably succeeded in because he learned many new kata from Fujian, the home of Baihequan (Chinese 白鶴 拳, Pinyin báihèquán) and adopted it in his style. The teachings of this temple provided the basis for the Naha-te style of Okinawan karate.

Following passing of Higaonna Kanryo, the style began to take a new direction and became a purely "internal" combat style. This was due in large part to the influence of Choki Motobu.

Although Motobu's sensei style is still considered Naha-te, it actually had nothing to do with Higashionna. When Motobu became the leader of Shōrei-ryū, he began to guide his development in another direction, mainly because he trained with Anko Itosu of the Shuri-te style, a disciple of the great Sokon Matsumura.

Features of style
The main features of Shōrei-ryū are the use of open hands, circular block techniques, and kicks to the gedan (lower-level) area.

In addition, the use of short and hard techniques in close combat in combination with throwing techniques is a specialty, especially from the sanchin and shiko-dachi stances. Great importance is also attached to training on the makiwara.

Another peculiarity is that the handling of Kobudō weapons such as bo, tonfa or sai is also very practiced.

Shōrei-ryū Kata 

Shōrei-ryū originates various kata that would be used in descendant styles like Gōjū-ryū and others.

Further development

Modern descendants of Shōrei-ryū include styles such as Gōjū-ryū and Ryūei-ryū. Gōjū-ryū is considered the direct evolution of Shōrei-ryū.

The Shitō-ryū style also contains many elements of Shōrei-ryū, since Mabuni Kenwa was a student of Higaonna, and even the Shōtōkan style contains kata from Shōrei-ryū, which, however, did not get there directly, but were passed on to Funakoshi Gichin and his students via Mabuni Kenwa. 

The Shōrei-ryū name (alternatively, Goju-Shorei-Ryu and later, Shorei-Goju Ryu) was also used for the style of karate brought to the United States by Robert Trias. Later, Trias used the name Shuri-Ryu, although some lineages still use the Shorei Ryu name.  This style should not be confused with traditional Shōrei-ryū. Trias's karate incorporated elements from Naha-te, Shuri-te, Tomari-te, and others.

See also 
 Naha-te
 Shuri-ryū karate.

References

External links 
 Trias Karate
 Vic Moore
 International Shōrei Martial Arts Academy
 Fourways Martial Arts Academy
 Shorei Ryu Karate Studios

•   https://kondonoshokai.com/

Okinawan karate
Traditional karate
Japanese martial arts